Planetary romance is a subgenre of science fiction  in which the bulk of the action consists of adventures on one or more exotic alien planets, characterized by distinctive physical and cultural backgrounds. Some planetary romances take place against the background of a future culture where travel between worlds by spaceship is commonplace; others, particularly the earliest examples of the genre, do not, and invoke flying carpets, astral projection, or other methods of getting between planets. In either case, it is the planetside adventures which are the focus of the story, not the mode of travel.

The Encyclopedia of Science Fiction mentions two caveats as to the usage of the term. First, while the setting may be in an alien world, if "the nature or description of this world has little bearing on the story being told," as in A Case of Conscience, then the book is not a planetary romance. Second, hard science fiction tales are excluded from this category, where an alien planet, while being a critical component of the plot, is just a background for a primarily scientific endeavor, such as Hal Clement's Mission of Gravity, possibly with embellishments.

A significant precursor of the genre is Edwin L. Arnold's Lieut. Gullivar Jones: His Vacation (1905).

In Science Fiction: The 100 Best Novels (1985), editor and critic David Pringle named Marion Zimmer Bradley and Anne McCaffrey two "leading practitioners nowadays" for the planetary romance type of science fiction.

There is a significant overlap of the genre with that of sword and planet.

Examples

In fiction 
 Almuric by Robert E. Howard
 Arrakis (in the Dune series) by Frank Herbert
 Barsoom (Mars) and Amtor (Venus) by Edgar Rice Burroughs
 Callisto by Lin Carter 
 Darkover by Marion Zimmer Bradley
 Eldorado by Francis Carsac
 Several works by Alan Dean Foster: Midworld, Sentenced to Prism, Voyage to the City of the Dead, Drowning World, and most of the Flinx and Pip stories
 Gor by John Norman
 Hainish Cycle by Ursula K. Le Guin
 The Books of the Raksura by Martha Wells
 Helliconia by Brian Aldiss
 Jack of Shadows by Roger Zelazny
 Kregen by Kenneth Bulmer
 Krishna by L. Sprague de Camp
 Majipoor by Robert Silverberg
 Pern by Anne McCaffrey
 The Radio Man by Ralph Milne Farley
 Riverworld, The Green Odyssey and World of Tiers by Philip José Farmer
 The Saga of the Skolian Empire by Catherine Asaro, including the worlds of Raylicon, Balimul, Parthonia, Debra, and Skyfall.
 The Space Trilogy by C. S. Lewis.
 Michael Kane of Old Mars by Michael Moorcock
 Tormance in A Voyage to Arcturus by David Lindsay
 Much of the science fiction work of Jack Vance: the Big Planet duo, the Alastor trio, the Durdane trilogy, the Cadwal Chronicles trilogy, the Tschai or Planet of Adventure tetralogy, most of the Magnus Ridolph stories, the Demon Princes pentalogy, and various stand-alone novels such as Maske: Thaery and short stories such as The Moon Moth.

In comics 
 Adam Strange
 Buck Rogers
 Flash Gordon
 Space Family Robinson
 World of Two Moons/Abode—ElfquestElfquest
 Den
 The Trigan Empire
 Apokolips and New Genesis—Fourth World 
 The Joker System—Five Star Stories
 "Planet Hulk"
 "World War Hulk"
 Ythaq: The Forsaken World

In film and television 
 Aquaman - film adaptation of Aquaman franchise primarily set in the fantastical and technologically advanced five kingdoms of Atlantis at the bottom of the sea
 Avatar – James Cameron film set exclusively on the fictional world of Pandora. 
 Defiance – TV series set exclusively on a terraformed, altered version of Earth itself.
 Earth 2 – TV series set exclusively on an Earth-like planet known as 'G889'.
 Forbidden Planet — an early film in the genre (1956), set entirely on the planet Altair IV.
 Irandaam Ulagam – Indian Tamil language film
 John Carter – A film depicting a romanticized version of Mars (Barsoom).
 Thor: Ragnarok - A film based on Planet Hulk, primarily set on the planets of Asgard and Sakaar

Miscellaneous 
 Byston Well — Aura Battler Dunbine
 Eternia and Etheria — Masters of the Universe 
 Sagar — Blackstar
 Third Earth — Thundercats

See also 
 Planets in science fiction
 Soft science fiction
 Space opera

References

External links
 Planetary romance on The Encyclopedia of Science Fiction